That Old Feeling is an album by saxophonist Bud Shank recorded in 1986 and released on the Contemporary label.

Reception

Scott Yanow of Allmusic said "This modern bop set with pianist George Cables, bassist John Heard and drummer Tootie Heath finds Shank at his most passionate and creative, stretching out on jazz standards and an eccentric blues".

Track listing
 "Whisper Not" (Benny Golson) - 5:16
 "Dream Dancing" (Cole Porter) - 5:52
 "Cabin in the Sky" (Vernon Duke, John La Touche) - 7:38
 "El Wacko" (Bud Shank) - 4:10
 "No Moe" (Sonny Rollins) - 5:27
 "I've Told Ev'ry Little Star" (Jerome Kern, Oscar Hammerstein II) - 5:07
 "As Time Goes By" (Herman Hupfeld) - 5:10
 "That Old Feeling" (Sammy Fain, Lew Brown) - 5:47

Personnel
Bud Shank - alto saxophone
George Cables - piano
John Heard - bass
Albert Heath - drums

References

1986 albums
Contemporary Records albums
Bud Shank albums